is a Japanese ultramarathon and marathon runner. Sho won gold and bronze medals in IAU 100 km Road World Championship in 2005, 2006 and 2007. She is the five-time winner of Tsukuba Marathon.

References

1970 births
Living people
Japanese ultramarathon runners
Japanese female long-distance runners
Female ultramarathon runners
20th-century Japanese women
21st-century Japanese women